The Hero of the Soviet Union was the highest distinction of the Soviet Union. It was awarded 12,775 times. Due to the large size of the list, it has been broken up into multiple pages.

Military personnel

Partisans

Leaders

Cosmonauts

Test pilots

Arctic pilots

References

Lists of Heroes of the Soviet Union